Devonte Malik Wyatt (born March 31, 1998) is an American football defensive end for the Green Bay Packers of the National Football League (NFL). He played college football at Georgia and was drafted by the Packers in the first round of the 2022 NFL Draft.

Early life and high school
Wyatt grew up in Decatur, Georgia and attended Towers High School. He was rated a three-star recruit and initially committed to play college football at South Carolina before de-committing in favor of Georgia. Wyatt was ruled academically ineligible to play at Georgia and did not enroll.

College career
Wyatt began his collegiate career at Hutchinson Community College in order to meet the academic requirements to play Division I football. As a freshman, he had 30 tackles, 4.5 tackles for loss, and three sacks. Wyatt qualified academically to enroll at Georgia after his freshman season.

Wyatt was part of Georgia's defensive line rotation as a sophomore and as a junior. As a senior, Wyatt started all ten of Georgia's games and had 25 tackles, two tackles for loss, and 14 quarterback hurries. After considering entering the 2021 NFL Draft, he decided to utilize the extra year of eligibility granted to college athletes who played in the 2020 season due to the coronavirus pandemic and return to Georgia for a fifth season. Wyatt was named first-team All-Southeastern Conference by the league's coaches and a second-team All-American by the Associated Press in the 2021 season. On January 15, 2022, Wyatt declared for the 2022 NFL Draft.

Professional career

Green Bay Packers
Wyatt was selected with the 28th overall pick by the Green Bay Packers in the 2022 NFL Draft. On May 6, 2022, he signed his rookie contract.

References

External links
Green Bay Packers bio
Georgia Bulldogs bio
Hutchinson Blue Dragons bio

1998 births
Living people
American football defensive tackles
Players of American football from Georgia (U.S. state)
Georgia Bulldogs football players
People from Decatur, Georgia
Sportspeople from DeKalb County, Georgia
Green Bay Packers players